Pierre Clementi (28 May 1910 – 16 April 1982), real name Francis Anthony Clementi, was a French politician active during the 1930s and the occupation of France during the Second World War. He was the founder and leader of the French National-Collectivist Party, which espoused a platform of National Communism, a combination of Fascism, French nationalism and to a certain extent Communism.

Biography 
Son of a Corsican official who died in the First World War, he was first close to radical socialist circles, then moved towards Fascism in 1934 with the founding of the French National-Communist Party (Parti français national-communiste ), which later changed its name under the orders of the Nazi Occupation to the French National-Collectivist Party (Parti français national-collectiviste), which Clémenti supported. He was the director of the movement's newspaper, :fr:Le Pays libre.

in 1941 he helped found the Legion of French Volunteers Against Bolshevism (Légion des volontaires français contre le bolchevisme ) (LVF), and participated in combat in Russia, as did Marcel Bucard's Mouvement Franciste, Marcel Déat's National Popular Rally, Jacques Doriot's French Popular Party and Eugène Deloncle's Social Revolutionary Movement.

Ater the liberation, he was condemned to death in absentia, but remained in Italy and Germany. He became a member of the Rassemblement européen de la liberté (REL) active from 1966 through 1969, then of Ordre Nouveau, active from 1969 to 1973. He represented the French section of René Binet's Nouvel ordre européen, a European neofascist movement that included the CEDADE in Spain and the Sozialistische Reichspartei in West Germany,

Publications 
 Qu'est-ce que le national-communisme?
 Qu'est-ce que le national collectivisme?, 1938
 La Troisième Paix, 1949

References

 Michaël Lenoire, "Pierre Clémenti (François Clémenti, dit)", in Pierre-André Taguieff (dir.), L'Antisémitisme de plume 1940-1944 : Études et Documents, Paris, Berg International éditeurs, coll. Pensée politique et sciences sociales, 1999, p. 358–365.
Andreas Wirsching, "Tradition contre-révolutionnaire et socialisme national : le Parti français national-communiste 1934-1939", dans Gilbert Merlio (dir.), Ni gauche, ni droite : les chassés-croisés idéologiques des intellectuels français et allemands dans l'Entre-deux-guerres, Talence, Éditions de la Maison des sciences de l'homme d'Aquitaine, coll. Publications de la MSHA (no 194), 1995, p. 245–253

External links 

Nicolas Lebourg, "Les Anciens SS ont reconstruit l'extrême droite française après 1945", slate.fr, May 8, 2014 (retrieved October 17, 2016).

1910 births
1982 deaths
French collaborators with Nazi Germany
French fascists
National Bolsheviks
Legion of French Volunteers Against Bolshevism